Robert W. "Bob" Goodenow (born October 29, 1952 in Dearborn, Michigan) is an American lawyer who served as the second executive director of the NHL Players Association from 1992 until his resignation on July 28, 2005.

He graduated from Harvard University in 1974 and from the University of Detroit Law School in 1979.

Goodenow succeeded Alan Eagleson as the head of the NHLPA in 1992 upon Eagleson's resignation. In his first couple months on the job, he led the players out on a 10-day strike on the eve of the Stanley Cup playoffs.

Two years later, Goodenow and NHL Commissioner Gary Bettman oversaw a 103-day lockout that lasted from October 1, 1994 to January 11, 1995.

Goodenow was also the NHLPA's Executive Director during the 2004–05 labor dispute, which resulted in the cancellation of the 
2004–05 NHL season.  A tentative agreement was reached on July 13, 2005.

On July 28, 2005, Goodenow was asked to step down as NHLPA chief and was replaced by Ted Saskin, NHLPA Senior Director of Business Affairs and Licensing and the head negotiator during the CBA contract talks. This resignation came less than two weeks after the NHL and the NHLPA came to the new CBA.

On December 15, 2007, TSN reported that Goodenow had been hired by Russian businessman Alexander Medvedev to help in the creation of a European hockey league to rival the NHL. The Kontinental Hockey League was eventually formed a year later.

Awards and honors

References

1952 births
Living people
Harvard University alumni
University of Detroit Mercy alumni
National Hockey League Players Association executive directors
Sportspeople from Dearborn, Michigan
Harvard Crimson men's ice hockey players